The Puerto Rican Athletics Federation (FAPUR; Federación de Atletismo de Puerto Rico) is the governing body for the sport of athletics in Puerto Rico.  Current president is José Enrique Arrarás.  He was re-elected in October 2012.

History 
FAPUR was founded in 1947 as Federación de Atletismo Aficionado de Puerto Rico and was affiliated to the IAAF in 1948.

Presidents 
Starting with the foundation of FAPUR in 1947, there were nine presidents and
an intermediate board.

Affiliations 
FAPUR is the national member federation for Puerto Rico in the following international organisations:
International Association of Athletics Federations (IAAF)
North American, Central American and Caribbean Athletic Association (NACAC)
Association of Panamerican Athletics (APA)
Asociación Iberoamericana de Atletismo (AIA; Ibero-American Athletics Association)
Central American and Caribbean Athletic Confederation (CACAC)
Moreover, it is part of the following national organisations:
Puerto Rico Olympic Committee (COPUR; Comité Olímpico de Puerto Rico)

National records 
FAPUR maintains the Puerto Rican records in track and field.

References

External links 
Official Webpage (in Spanish)
FAPUR on Facebook (in Spanish)

See also
 Ponce Marathon

Puerto Rico
Sports governing bodies in Puerto Rico
Athletics in Puerto Rico
National governing bodies for athletics
Sports organizations established in 1947